The collared bush robin or Johnstone's robin (Tarsiger johnstoniae) is a species of bird in the family Muscicapidae. It is endemic to Taiwan, living in montane and subalpine forests. The International Union for Conservation of Nature (IUCN) has assessed it as a least-concern species.

Taxonomy
This species was described as Ianthia johnstoniae by William Robert Ogilvie-Grant in 1906: the specimens were collected by Walter Goodfellow on Yushan (Mount Morrison).  It has also been included in the genus Luscinia. The species' eponym is named after Marion A. Johnstone, a well-known aviculturist to whom Goodfellow previously sent a specimen of a lorikeet.

Description
The male and female are different. The male has a slate-black head with a white supercilium. The rufous upper breast, mantle and scapulars form a collar. The back is sooty-black, the wings are black and brownish-black, and the tail is black. The lower breast is buffish-yellow, and the belly varies from grey-white to buffish-olive. The beak and legs are black. The female has a less distinct supercilium. The upperparts are mostly dull olive-brown, and the wings and tail are dark brown. The underparts are variable. The throat and breast are warm brown, but the throat is sometimes blackish, and the breast can be pale yellow or yellowish-olive. The juvenile bird can be distinguished from the female by its pale buff streaks and spots.

Distribution and habitat
It descends to lower elevations in winter. It lives in undergrowth of coniferous forests with shrubs and bamboo. It can also be seen in parks and along roads.

Behaviour
The collared bush robin is often seen in pairs and also singly. It catches insects by striking from perches, and it also forages for invertebrates on the ground and in low plants. Its calls include tuc notes with pi notes in between, a low grruit, and a combination of piping and grating notes. It sings from a perch, giving a series of phrases each consisting of two or three high-pitched, sibilant notes. Breeding occurs from March to August, and there are two broods per year. A territory is defended by the male and female. The female builds a cup nest made of plants and lays two to three eggs. The collared bush robin sometimes hybridises with subspecies formosanus of the white-browed bush robin.

Status
Suspected to have a stable population, this species has been assessed by the IUCN as being of least concern.

In popular culture 
This article was the topic of conversation in the second episode of series one of the web series "Two Of These People Are Lying" hosted by The Technical Difficulties.

See also
List of protected species in Taiwan
List of endemic species of Taiwan
List of endemic birds of Taiwan

References

collared bush robin
Endemic birds of Taiwan
Taxa named by William Robert Ogilvie-Grant
collared bush robin
Taxonomy articles created by Polbot